Staci Mannella (born 1996) is an American Paralympic alpine skier. She won various medals during the IPC Alpine World Ski Championships and World Cups.

Career 
At the 2016 World Cup in Kranjska Gora, Slovenia, which opened the season on January 16, Mannella guided by Sadie De Baun won the gold in 1:37.72, pushing the South Korean Jae Rim Yang to 2nd place (in 1:38.16, guided by Un So Ri Koe), and in 3rd place compatriot Danelle Umstead (in 1:40.40, guided by her husband Robert).

In the 2016 season, Mannella and her sighted guide Sadie de Baun were on the podium three times in the slalom, winning twice. This result lifted them to the top of the standings, 20 points clear of Danelle Umstead and her guide, her husband Rob of her. In the giant slalom, Mannella found herself 80 points behind Belgian Eléonor Sana and her guide Chloe Sana. Staci Mannella with guide Sadie de Baun reached 1st place, in giant slalom at the IPC Paralympic Alpine Ski World Cup in Tarvisio in 2016, in a time of 2:05.87, followed by Eléonor Sana and guide Chloe Sana, who finished second in 2:09.40. 3rd place went to Marie-Morgane Dessartwith the guide Antoine Marine Francois in 2:29.51.

At the 2017 Aspen Women's Slalom World Cup for the Blind, the slalom and giant slalom races were closely contested; with 1:29.36 Mannella won the slalom race VI  and with 2:02.97 she finished second in the giant slalom race VI, behind her colleague Danelle Umstead.

At the 2017 World Para Alpine Skiing Championships, she won a bronze medal in Super combined, and placed fifth in Women's Super-G VI.

Mannella was the youngest member of the U.S. national alpine ski team at the 2014 Paralympic Winter Games in Sochi, where she placed sixth in the slalom, and giant slalom events.

At the 2018 Paralympic Winter Games in Pyeongchang, Mannella broke her thumb, but was still able to compete, finishing ninth in Women's Slalom Visually Impaired, and tenth in Women's Giant Slalom Visually Impaired, and Women's Super-G Visually Impaired.

References 

Paralympic alpine skiers
Living people
1996 births